Mone Pore Aajo Shei Din is a Bengali language romantic drama film directed by Ajay Singh and Sudipto Ghatak. The family entertainer is a love story with a twist. The title of the movie name is based on its musical drama content. The soundtrack of the film was composed by Indradeep Dasgupta, with one song by Dev Sen. The film stars Joy Kumar Mukherjee, Sayantika Banerjee in the lead roles.

Cast

Joy Kumar Mukherjee as Rahul
Sayantika Banerjee as Sunaina
 Biswajit Chakraborty
 Moumita Gupta
 Mousumi Saha

Soundtrack album
The music was composed by Indradeep Dasgupta and Dev Sen. The album contains five songs.

References

2011 films
Bengali-language Indian films
2010s Bengali-language films